This article describes the transport in Peru.

Railways

total:  2,374 km
standard gauge:  1,608 km,  gauge 
narrow gauge:  380 km,  gauge

There are two unconnected principal railways in Peru.

The Ferrocarril Central Andino (FCCA; the former Ferrocarril Central del Perú) runs inland from Callao and Lima across the Andes watershed to La Oroya and Huancayo. Both branch and spur have since closed to traffic. From Huancayo the route is extended by the Ferrocarril Huancayo - Huancavelica. There was also a proposal for a 21 km tunnel under the Andes.

The Ferrocarriles del Sur del Perú (FCS), now operated by PeruRail, runs from the coast at Matarani to Cuzco, and to Puno on Lake Titicaca. From Cuzco, PeruRail runs the  gauge line to Aguas Calientes for Machu Picchu.

Towns served

Central railways

See Ferrocarril Central Andino

By October 2010 it was finished and it is in service now.

Southern railway
See PeruRail

Metro

Lima has a metro service or Lima Metro, also called Tren eléctrico that has now only one line (called Linea 1). The line has an extension of 34.6 km. with 26 stations, and goes from the south east to north east Lima urban districts passing downtown (This is Villa El Salvador to San Juan de Lurigancho). The second line (called Linea 2) is now under construction and will run from the port of Callao to Ate passing downtown too (west to east).(2015).

Huancayo Metro is the second urban rail line in Peru, is located in the Andean city of Huancayo and is currently under construction (2012).

Proposed

 Mining railway to Bayovar port by 2019.  Also to Paita port.
 Cajamarca - mine
 Tren de la Costa

Highways
total:
85,900 km
paved:
45,000 km (Of which approximately 350 km. of divided multi-line roads)
unpaved:
40,900 km (1999 est.)

The Pan-American Highway runs the country from north to south next to the coast, from Tumbes (Ecuadoran border) to Tacna (Chilean border). From Arequipa a branch goes to Puno and then to Bolivia. Other important highways in Peru are the Longitudinal de la Sierra, that goes from north to south in the highlands; and the Carretera Central, that goes from Lima (in the coast) to Pucallpa (in the jungle).

Long distance buses
Inter-city travel in Peru is almost exclusively done in long-distance buses. Buses in most of the cities depart from bus terminals called terminal terrestre. The main bus companies which link Lima with the major cities include Cruz del Sur and Ormeño. Other companies are Civa and Oltursa.

Maps
 UN Map
 UNHCR Map for Peru and Ecuador

Waterways
8,600 km of navigable tributaries of Amazon system and 208 km of Lake Titicaca.

There are river boat service from Yurimaguas and Pucallpa to Iquitos, and from there to the Brazilian border in the Amazon river. Touristic boats can be reached at Puno in Lake Titicaca.

Pipelines
 crude oil 800 km
 natural gas and natural gas liquids 64 km

Ports and harbors

Pacific Ocean

Lake Titicaca
 Puno

Amazon basin
 Iquitos
 Pucallpa
 Yurimaguas

Merchant marine
total:
7 ships ( or over) totaling /
ships by type: (1999 est.)
 bulk carrier 1
 cargo ships 6

Airports and airlines
Airports

According to a 1999 estimate there are 234 airports in Peru. Jorge Chavez International Airport, in Lima is Peru's main national and international gateway, with an estimate of 98 percent of all international flights into Peru landing at this airport. Other important airports are located in Cusco, Arequipa, Iquitos and Piura.

Airports - with paved runways:
total:
44
over 3,047 m:
7
2,438 to 3,047 m:
17
1,524 to 2,437 m:
12
914 to 1,523 m:
7
under 914 m:
1 (1999 est.)

Airports - with unpaved runways:
total:
190
over 3,047 m:
1
2,438 to 3,047 m:
2
1,524 to 2,437 m:
26
914 to 1,523 m:
67
under 914 m:
94 (1999 est.)

Airlines

International airlines connecting Peru with North America, Europe and other Latin American countries include: Delta Air Lines, American Airlines, United Airlines, Air Canada, Iberia, Air France, KLM, LATAM Airlines, Avianca, AeroMexico, and British Airways.
Airlines in Peru with domestic service in Peru include LAN Peru, Star Peru, Peruvian Airlines, and LC Perú. Charter and Cargo airlines include ATSA, Andes Air and Cielos Airlines.
Former Peruvian airlines include Aero Continente, AeroPerú and Faucett.

See also
 Rail transport in Peru

References

External links

 Cial
 Civa
 Cruz del Sur
 Flores
 Oltursa
 Ormeño
 Tepsa
 Ferrocarril Central 
 Perurail
 Brief historical summary of the railroads in Peru
 List of peruvian cities
Transporte en Bus